Gum Spring and Gum Springs may refer to:

Gum Springs, Arkansas, a town in Clark County
Gum Spring, Virginia, an unincorporated community in Louisa County
Gum Spring, West Virginia, an unincorporated community in Monongalia County
Gum Springs, Virginia, an unincorporated community in Fairfax County
Gum Springs, Simpson County, Mississippi, a former unincorporated community near Braxton, Mississippi
Gum Springs, Winston County, Mississippi, a former unincorporated community near Louisville, Mississippi